IILM Institute for Higher Education is a higher education institute, headquartered in Lodhi Road, New Delhi, India, with a second campus in Greater Noida, Uttar Pradesh. It was established in 1993 in Gurgaon, Haryana. In 2018 the Gurgaon institute was declared a private university, the IILM University.

Campuses
The Lodhi Road, New Delhi campus is located in the heart of Lutyens' Delhi. It houses the IILM Institute for Higher Education and the IILM Undergraduate business school. The Greater Noida campus is located in the Knowledge Park educational zone. It comprises the College of Engineering and Technology, the College of Pharmacy, and the Graduate School of Management. Engineering and pharmacy courses are affiliated with Uttar Pradesh Technical University. The campus provides excellent learning since 1996. It is quite good B-School under budget, who has a low budget, can get admission to this college. The campus also has 2 cafes in both campus i.e. in Engineering campus and in Management campus named Scholar's Cafe and Box Cafe. There is also a Sai Temple and a Idol of Goddess Sarasvati in the campus

References

External links 
 

Universities and colleges in Delhi